Kerckhoven is the surname of the following people:

 Jehan van der Kerckhove, Lord of Heenvliet (1594–1660), Dutch diplomat, husband of Katherine Stanhope, Countess of Chesterfield
 Abraham van den Kerckhoven (c.1618–c.1701), Flemish composer and organist
 Peter Frans Van Kerckhoven (1818–1857), Flemish writer
 Jan van Kerckhoven, editor of Gazet van Antwerpen between 1893 and 1899
 Anne-Mie van Kerckhoven (born 1951), Belgian artist
 Nico Van Kerckhoven (born 1970), Belgian footballer
 Robert Van Kerckhoven, Belgian footballer
 Patrick van Kerckhoven (DJ Ruffneck), Dutch darkcore/gabber DJ and producer

See also
 Kerkhoven (disambiguation)